Lepidodactylus pulcher, also known as the Wild scaly-toed gecko or Admiralty gecko, is a species of gecko. It is endemic to the Admiralty Islands (Papua New Guinea).

References

Lepidodactylus
Endemic fauna of Papua New Guinea
Reptiles of Papua New Guinea
Taxa named by George Albert Boulenger
Reptiles described in 1885
Geckos of New Guinea